The 2022–23 Carolina Hurricanes season is the 44th season for the National Hockey League (NHL) franchise that was established in June 1979, and 25th season since the franchise relocated from the Hartford Whalers to start the 1997–98 NHL season.

Standings

Divisional standings

Conference standings

Schedule and results

Preseason 

|- style="background:#cfc;"
| 1 || September 27 || Tampa Bay Lightning || 5–1 ||  || Andersen || PNC Arena || 10,083 || 1–0 ||
|- style="background:#bbb;"
| — || September 28 || @ Tampa Bay Lightning || colspan="7"|Game postponed due to the impending threat from Hurricane Ian. Makeup date: TBA.
|- style="background:#cfc;"
| 2 || September 29 || @ Florida Panthers || 5–2 ||  || Raanta || FLA Live Arena || 6,156 || 2–0–0 ||
|- style="background:#cfc;"
| 3 || October 1 || Florida Panthers || 4–3 || OT || Andersen || PNC Arena || 14,843 || 3–0–0 ||
|- style="background:#cfc;"
| 4 || October 3 || Columbus Blue Jackets || 8–1 ||  || Raanta || PNC Arena || 9,334 || 4–0–0 ||
|- style="background:#fcc;"
| 5 || October 4 || @ Buffalo Sabres || 2–4 ||  || Kochetkov || KeyBank Center  || 9,812 || 4–1–0 ||
|-

Regular season 

|- style="background:#cfc;"
| 1 || October 12 || Columbus Blue Jackets || 4–1 || || Andersen || PNC Arena || 18,824 || 1–0–0 || 2 ||
|- style="background:#cfc;"
| 2 || October 14 || @ San Jose Sharks || 2–1 || || Raanta || SAP Center || 17,562 || 2–0–0 || 4 ||
|- style="background:#cfc;"
| 3 || October 17 || @ Seattle Kraken || 5–1 || || Andersen || Climate Pledge Arena || 17,151 || 3–0–0 || 6 ||
|- style="background:#fcc;"
| 4 || October 20 || @ Edmonton Oilers || 4–6 || || Andersen || Rogers Place || 16,023 || 3–1–0 ||  6 ||
|- style="background:#ffc;"
| 5 || October 22 || @ Calgary Flames || 2–3 || OT || Raanta || Scotiabank Saddledome || 17,210 ||  3–1–1 || 7 ||
|- style="background:#cfc;"
| 6 || October 24 || @ Vancouver Canucks || 3–2 || || Andersen || Rogers Arena || 18,775 || 4–1–1 || 9 ||
|- style="background:#fcc;"
| 7 || October 28 || New York Islanders || 2–6 || || Andersen || PNC Arena || 18,680 || 4–2–1 || 9 ||
|- style="background:#cfc;"
| 8 || October 29 || @ Philadelphia Flyers || 4–3 || OT || Raanta || Wells Fargo Center || 13,335 || 5–2–1 || 11 ||
|- style="background:#cfc;"
| 9 || October 31 || Washington Capitals || 3–2 || SO || Andersen || PNC Arena || 16,211 || 6–2–1 || 13 ||
|-

|- style="background:#cfc;"
| 10 || November 3 || @ Tampa Bay Lightning || 4–3 || SO || Andersen || Amalie Arena || 19,092 || 7–2–1 || 15 ||
|- style="background:#cfc;"
| 11 || November 4 || Buffalo Sabres || 5–3 || || Raanta || PNC Arena || 18,727 || 8–2–1 || 17 ||
|- style="background:#fcc;"
| 12 || November 6 || Toronto Maple Leafs || 1–3 || || Andersen || PNC Arena || 18,463 || 8–3–1 || 17 ||
|- style="background:#fcc;"
| 13 || November 9 || @ Florida Panthers || 0–3 || || Raanta || FLA Live Arena || 13,225 || 8–4–1 || 17 ||
|- style="background:#cfc;"
| 14 || November 10 || Edmonton Oilers || 7–2 || || Kochetkov || PNC Arena || 18,118 || 9–4–1 || 19 ||
|- style="background:#fcc;"
| 15 || November 12 || @ Colorado Avalanche || 1–4 || || Raanta || Ball Arena || 18,127 || 10–4–1 || 21 ||
|- style="background:#cfc;"
| 16 || November 14 || @ Chicago Blackhawks || 3–0 || || Kochetkov || United Center || 15,676 || 10–5–1 || 21 ||
|- style="background:#ffc;"
| 17 || November 17 || Colorado Avalanche || 2–3 || OT || Raanta || PNC Arena || 18,680 || 10–5–2 || 22 ||
|- style="background:#ffc;"
| 18 || November 19 || @ Minnesota Wild || 1–2 || OT || Kochetkov || Xcel Energy Center || 18,278 || 10–5–3 || 23 ||
|- style="background:#ffc;"
| 19 || November 21 || @ Winnipeg Jets || 3–4 || OT || Kochetkov || Canada Life Centre || 13,346 || 10–5–4 || 24 ||
|- style="background:#fcc;"
| 20 || November 23 || Arizona Coyotes || 0–4 || || Kochetkov || PNC Arena || 18,775 || 10–6–4 || 24 ||
|- style="background:#ffc;"
| 21 || November 25 || @ Boston Bruins || 2–3 || OT || Kochetkov || TD Garden || 17,850 || 10–6–5 || 25 ||
|- style="background:#cfc;"
| 22 || November 26 || Calgary Flames || 3–2 || || Raanta || PNC Arena || 18,845 || 11–6–5 || 27 ||
|- style="background:#cfc;"
| 23 || November 29 || @ Pittsburgh Penguins || 3–2 || OT || Kochetkov || PPG Paints Arena || 15,942 || 12–6–5 || 29 ||
|-

|- style="background:#cfc;"
| 24 || December 1 || @ St. Louis Blues || 6–4 || || Kochetkov || Enterprise Center || 18,096 || 13–6–5 || 31 ||
|- style="background:#cfc;"
| 25 || December 3 || @ Los Angeles Kings || 4–2 || || Kochetkov || Crypto.com Arena || 16,067 || 14–6–5 || 33 ||
|- style="background:#ffc;"
| 26 || December 6 || @ Anaheim Ducks || 3–4 || OT || Kochetkov || Honda Center || 14,576 || 14–6–6 || 34 ||
|- style="background:#cfc;"
| 27 || December 10 || @ New York Islanders || 3–0 || || Kochetkov || UBS Arena || 17,255 ||  15–6–6 || 36 || 
|- style="background:#cfc;"
| 28 || December 13 || @ Detroit Red Wings || 1–0 || || Kochetkov || Little Caesars Arena || 19,515 || 16–6–6 ||  38 || 
|- style="background:#cfc;"
| 29 || December 15 || Seattle Kraken || 3–2 || || Kochetkov || PNC Arena || 18,680 || 17–6–6 || 40 || 
|- style="background:#cfc;"
| 30 || December 17 || Dallas Stars || 5–4 || OT || Raanta || PNC Arena || 18,680 || 18–6–6 || 42 || 
|- style="background:#cfc;"
| 31 || December 18 || Pittsburgh Penguins || 3–2 || || Kochetkov || PNC Arena || 18,117 || 19–6–6 || 44 || 
|- style="background:#cfc;"
| 32 || December 20 || New Jersey Devils || 4–1 || || Kochetkov || PNC Arena || 18,680 || 20–6–6 || 46 || 
|- style="background:#cfc;"
| 33 || December 22 || @ Pittsburgh Penguins || 4–3 || OT || Raanta || PPG Paints Arena || 18,075 || 21–6–6 || 48 || 
|- style="background:#cfc;"
| 34 || December 23 || Philadelphia Flyers || 6–5 || || Raanta || PNC Arena || 18,680 || 22–6–6 || 50 || 
|- style="background:#cfc;"
| 35 || December 27 || Chicago Blackhawks || 3–0 || || Raanta || PNC Arena || 18,814 || 23–6–6 || 52 || 
|- style="background:#cfc;"
| 36 || December 30 || Florida Panthers || 4–0 || || Raanta || PNC Arena || 18,767 || 24–6–6 || 54 || 
|-

|- style="background:#cfc;"
| 37 || January 1 || @ New Jersey Devils || 5–4 || SO || Raanta || Prudential Center || 16,514 || 25–6–6 || 56 || 
|- style="background:#fcc;"
| 38 || January 3 || @ New York Rangers || 3–5 || || Kochetkov || Madison Square Garden || 17,747 || 25–7–6 || 56 || 
|- style="background:#fcc;"
| 39 || January 5 || Nashville Predators || 3–5 || || Kochetkov || PNC Arena || 18,344 || 25–8–6 || 56 || 
|- style="background:#ffc;"
| 40 || January 7 || @ Columbus Blue Jackets || 3–4 || SO || Raanta || Nationwide Arena || 18,663 || 25–8–7 || 57 || 
|- style="background:#fcc;"
| 41 || January 10 || New Jersey Devils || 3–5 || || Kochetkov || PNC Arena || 18,092 || 25–9–7 || 57 || 
|- style="background:#cfc;"
| 42 || January 12 || @ Columbus Blue Jackets || 6–2 || || Andersen || Nationwide Arena || 15,766 || 26–9–7 || 59 || 
|- style="background:#cfc;"
| 43 || January 14 || Pittsburgh Penguins || 2–1 || || Raanta || PNC Arena || 18,769 || 27–9–7 || 61 || 
|- style="background:#ffc;"
| 44 || January 15 || Vancouver Canucks || 3–4 || SO || Kochetkov || PNC Arena || 18,680 || 27–9–8 || 62 || 
|- style="background:#cfc;"
| 45 || January 19 || Minnesota Wild || 5–2 || || Andersen || PNC Arena || 18,013 ||  28–9–8 || 64 || 
|- style="background:#cfc;"
| 46 || January 21 || @ New York Islanders || 5–2 || || Andersen || UBS Arena || 17,255 || 29–9–8 || 66 || 
|- style="background:#cfc;"
| 47 || January 25 || @ Dallas Stars || 3–2 || OT || Raanta || American Airlines Center || 18,237 || 30–9–8 || 68 || 
|- style="background:#cfc;"
| 48 || January 27 || San Jose Sharks || 5–4 || OT || Raanta || PNC Arena || 18,780 || 31–9–8 || 70 || 
|- style="background:#cfc;"
| 49 || January 29 || Boston Bruins || 4–1 || || Andersen || PNC Arena || 18,959 || 32–9–8 || 72 || 
|- style="background:#cfc;"
| 50 || January 31 || Los Angeles Kings || 5–4 || OT || Andersen || PNC Arena || 18,443 || 33–9–8 || 74 || 
|-

|- style="background:#cfc;"
| 51 || February 1 || @ Buffalo Sabres || 5–1 || || Raanta || KeyBank Center || 14,166 || 34–9–8 || 76 || 
|- style="background:#fcc;"
| 52 || February 11 || New York Rangers || 2–6 || || Andersen || PNC Arena || 18,808 || 34–10–8 || 76 || 
|- style="background:#cfc;"
| 53 || February 14 || @ Washington Capitals || 3–2 || || Andersen || Capital One Arena || 18,573 || 35–10–8 || 78 || 
|- style="background:#cfc;"
| 54 || February 16 || Montreal Canadiens || 6–2 || || Raanta || PNC Arena || 18,680 || 36–10–8 || 80 || 
|- style="background:#cfc;"
| 55 || February 18 || Washington Capitals || 4–1 || || Andersen || Carter-Finley Stadium || 56,961(outdoors) || 37–10–8 || 82 || 
|- style="background:#cfc;"
| 56 || February 21 || St. Louis Blues || 4–1 || || Andersen || PNC Arena || 18,142 || 38–10–8 || 84 || 
|- style="background:#cfc;"
| 57 || February 24 || Ottawa Senators || 4–0 || || Raanta || PNC Arena || 18,788 || 39–10–8 || 86 || 
|- style="background:#fcc;"
| 58 || February 25 || Anaheim Ducks || 2–3 || || Andersen || PNC Arena || 18,818 || 39–11–8 || 86 || 
|-

|- style="background:#fcc;"
| 59 || March 1 || @ Vegas Golden Knights || 2–3 || || Andersen || T-Mobile Arena || 17,699 || 39–12–8 || 86 || 
|- style="background:#cfc;"
| 60 || March 3 || @ Arizona Coyotes || 6–1 || || Raanta || Mullett Arena || 4,600 || 40–12–8 || 88 || 
|- style="background:#cfc;"
| 61 || March 5 || Tampa Bay Lightning || 6–0 || || Andersen || PNC Arena || 18,965 || 41–12–8 || 90 || 
|- style="background:#cfc;"
| 62 || March 7 || @ Montreal Canadiens || 4–3 || SO || Andersen || Bell Centre || 21,105 || 42–12–8 || 92 || 
|- style="background:#cfc;"
| 63 || March 9 || Philadelphia Flyers || 1–0 || || Kochetkov || PNC Arena || 18,680 || 43–12–8 || 94 || 
|- style="background:#fcc;"
| 64 || March 11 || Vegas Golden Knights || 0–4 || || Andersen || PNC Arena || 18,813 || 43–13–8 || 94 || 
|- style="background:#fcc;"
| 65 || March 12 || @ New Jersey Devils || 0–3 || || Kochetkov || Prudential Center || 16,514 || 43–14–8 || 94 || 
|- style="background:#cfc;"
| 66 || March 14 || Winnipeg Jets || 5–3 || || Andersen || PNC Arena || 18,680 || 44–14–8 || 96 || 
|- style="background:#fcc;"
| 67 || March 17 || @ Toronto Maple Leafs || 2–5 || || Kochetkov || Scotiabank Arena || 18,607 || 44–15–8 || 96 || 
|- style="background:#;"
| 68 || March 18 || @ Philadelphia Flyers ||  || ||  || Wells Fargo Center ||  ||  ||  ||
|- style="background:#;"
| 69 || March 21 || @ New York Rangers ||  || ||  || Madison Square Garden ||  ||  ||  ||
|- style="background:#;"
| 70 || March 23 || New York Rangers ||  || ||  || PNC Arena ||  ||  ||  ||
|- style="background:#;"
| 71 || March 25 || Toronto Maple Leafs ||  || ||  || PNC Arena ||  ||  ||  ||
|- style="background:#;"
| 72 || March 26 || Boston Bruins ||  || ||  || PNC Arena ||  ||  ||  ||
|- style="background:#;"
| 73 || March 28 || Tampa Bay Lightning ||  || ||  || PNC Arena ||  ||  ||  ||
|- style="background:#;"
| 74 || March 30 || @ Detroit Red Wings ||  || ||  || Little Caesars Arena ||  ||  ||  ||
|-

|- style="background:#;"
| 75 || April 1 || @ Montreal Canadiens ||  || ||  || Bell Centre ||  ||  ||  ||
|- style="background:#;"
| 76 || April 2 || New York Islanders ||  || ||  || PNC Arena ||  ||  ||  ||
|- style="background:#;"
| 77 || April 4 || Ottawa Senators ||  || ||  || PNC Arena ||  ||  ||  ||
|- style="background:#;"
| 78 || April 6 || @ Nashville Predators ||  || ||  || Bridgestone Arena ||  ||  ||  ||
|- style="background:#;"
| 79 || April 8 || @ Buffalo Sabres ||  || ||  || KeyBank Center ||  ||  ||  ||
|- style="background:#;"
| 80 || April 10 || @ Ottawa Senators ||  || ||  || Canadian Tire Centre ||  ||  ||  ||
|- style="background:#;"
| 81 || April 11 || Detroit Red Wings ||  || ||  || PNC Arena ||  ||  ||  ||
|- style="background:#;"
| 82 || April 13 || @ Florida Panthers ||  || ||  || FLA Live Arena ||  ||  ||  ||
|-

|-
| 2022–23 schedule

Player statistics 
As of March 12, 2023

Skaters

Goaltenders 

†Denotes player spent time with another team before joining the Hurricanes. Stats reflect time with the Hurricanes only.
‡Denotes player was traded mid-season. Stats reflect time with the Hurricanes only.
Bold/italics denotes franchise record.

Roster

Transactions 
The Hurricanes have been involved in the following transactions during the 2022–23 season.

Key:

 Contract is entry-level.

 Contract initially takes effect in the 2023–24 NHL season.

Trades 

Notes:
 Carolina will receive the lower of Florida's, Philadelphia's, or the New York Rangers' 3rd-round pick in 2023.
 San Jose will receive the lower of Carolina's or Philadelphia's 3rd-round pick in 2023.

Players acquired

Players lost

Signings

Draft picks 

Below are the Carolina Hurricanes' selections at the 2022 NHL Entry Draft, which were held on July 7 to 8, 2022. It was held at the Bell Centre in Montreal, Quebec.

 The Carolina Hurricanes' first-round pick went to the Montreal Canadiens as compensation for not matching an offer sheet from Carolina to restricted free agent Jesperi Kotkaniemi on September 4, 2021.
 The Chicago Blackhawks' third-round pick went to the Carolina Hurricanes as the result of a trade on July 24, 2021, that sent a third-round pick in 2021 to Chicago in exchange for this pick.
 The Carolina Hurricanes' third-round pick went to the Montreal Canadiens as compensation for not matching an offer sheet from Carolina to restricted free agent Jesperi Kotkaniemi on September 4, 2021.
 The Philadelphia Flyers' fourth-round pick went to the Carolina Hurricanes as the result of a trade on July 8, 2022, that sent Tony DeAngelo and a seventh-round pick in 2022 (220th overall) to Philadelphia in exchange for a conditional third-round pick in 2023, a second-round pick in 2024 and this pick.
 The Anaheim Ducks' sixth-round pick went to the Carolina Hurricanes as the result of a trade on April 12, 2021, that sent Haydn Fleury to Anaheim in exchange for Jani Hakanpaa and this pick.
 The Carolina Hurricanes' sixth-round pick went to the Chicago Blackhawks as the result of a trade on July 8, 2022, that sent a sixth-round pick in 2023 to Carolina in exchange for this pick.
 The Columbus Blue Jackets' seventh-round pick went to the Carolina Hurricanes as the result of a trade on February 13, 2021, that sent Gregory Hofmann to Columbus in exchange for this pick.
 The Carolina Hurricanes' seventh-round pick went to the Philadelphia Flyers as the result of a trade on July 8, 2022, that sent a fourth-round pick in 2022 (101st overall), a conditional third-round pick in 2023 and a second-round pick in 2024 to Carolina in exchange for Tony DeAngelo and this pick.

References 

Carolina Hurricanes
Carolina Hurricanes seasons
Carolina Hurricanes
Carolina Hurricanes